Lower East Chezzetcook  is a rural  community of the Halifax Regional Municipality in the Canadian province of Nova Scotia.

References

Communities in Halifax, Nova Scotia
General Service Areas in Nova Scotia